Sir John Sinclair Wemyss Arbuthnot, 1st Baronet,  (11 February 1912 – 13 June 1992) was a British Conservative Party politician.

Early life and education
Arbuthnot was born in Kittybrewster, the son of Major Kenneth Wyndham Arbuthnot, who was the son of William Reierson Arbuthnot and Janet Elspeth Sinclair Wemyss.  Kenneth had served with the Seaforth Highlanders since 1893, fighting in the Chitral Expedition in 1895, in the Mahdist War in the Sudan in 1898 (including the Battle of Omdurman), and in the Second Boer War from 1900 to 1902.  He was brigade major of the Gordon Infantry Brigade when his son was born, but was killed in action in the Second Battle of Ypres in 1915.

John Arbuthnot was educated at Eton College, and Trinity College, Cambridge, where he graduated as a Bachelor of Arts in 1933.  He received his MA in 1938. He worked in the tea industry and was a Director of Folkestone and Dover Water Company and other companies.

Military service
Arbuthnot served in World War II in the Royal Artillery, rising to the rank of Major. In 1940, he was seconded to work with explosives and was appointed MBE for his scientific work in 1944.  He received the Territorial Decoration (TD) in 1951.

Political career
Arbuthnot stood for election in Don Valley in 1935 and Dover in 1945, losing to Labour candidates both times.  He was elected as the Member of Parliament (MP) for Dover in 1950, serving until 1964.  He was Parliamentary Private Secretary for the Minister of Pensions from 1952 to 1955 and for the Minister of Health from 1956 to 1957.  He was member of the Public Accounts Committee from 1955 to 1964.  He also served as Second Church Estates Commissioner, the spokesman for the Church of England in the House of Commons, and as a Deputy Speaker.

Honours
On 26 February 1964, Arbuthnot was created a baronet, of Kittybrewster in the County of the City of Aberdeen.

Family
Arbuthnot married (Margaret) Jean Duff, daughter of Alexander Gordon Duff on 3 July 1943. They had five children, two sons and three daughters.

Elizabeth Mary Arbuthnot (born 1947)
Sir William Reierson Arbuthnot, 2nd Baronet (1950–2021)
Rt Hon James Norwich Arbuthnot, Baron Arbuthnot of Edrom (life peerage) (born 1952) 
Louise Victoria Arbuthnot (born 1954), married David Bernard Lancaster, son of Major Bernard Thomas Lancaster on 16 June 1984
Alison Jane Arbuthnot (born 1957)

References

External links 

1912 births
1992 deaths
Military personnel from Aberdeen
Baronets in the Baronetage of the United Kingdom
John Sinclair Wemyss Arbuthnot
People educated at Eton College
Alumni of Trinity College, Cambridge
Royal Artillery officers
British Army personnel of World War II
Members of the Order of the British Empire
Conservative Party (UK) MPs for English constituencies
UK MPs 1950–1951
UK MPs 1951–1955
UK MPs 1955–1959
UK MPs 1959–1964
Members of the Parliament of the United Kingdom for Dover
Church Estates Commissioners